Rugby union in the Bailiwick of Guernsey is a popular sport. Outside the island of Guernsey itself, it is occasionally played in Alderney and Sark. Sark has its own rugby team, although it regularly has to pick up "guest" players to make up its numbers.

Governing body
Rugby is played in Guernsey under the auspices of the (English) Rugby Football Union.

History

Due to its proximity to the major rugby nations England and France, Guernsey rugby is among the oldest in the world, dating back to the mid 19th century. A number of schools play the sport, especially the private ones, such as Elizabeth College.

Guernsey RFC was founded in 1928  and competes in the English leagues.
There is only one other club in Guernsey, St Jacques RFC, which was founded in 1978. From the 2014/15 season St Jacques compete in the Hampshire Rugby Football Union (Hants) Solent Merit league. St Jacques home ground is the King George V (KGV) playing fields. The current coaches are Jon Bell, Rob Box and Peter Mcmachon, the current captain is Brett McFarlane. St Jacques have a squad of around 40 players, with many being recent graduates of the Guernsey Rugby Academy.

The Siam Cup is an annual Rugby Union competition held between Jersey Reds and Guernsey RFC. It was first contested in 1920. The trophy awarded its winner is the second oldest rugby honour contested after the Calcutta Cup.

Development of the sport is  limited due to the practicalities of small islands; Guernsey's national population is under 80,000. The main sport is association football.

Broadcast media
Guernsey has no television of its own (the ITV variant Channel Television sometimes includes rugby news) but does have its own radio stations. British and French television can both be received in the islands, and often include extensive rugby coverage - such as the Rugby World Cup and Six Nations Championship.

See also
 Rugby union in Jersey

External links
 http://www.grufc.co.uk/
 Guernsey Rugby Academy
 Guernsey Touch
 Guernsey vs Jersey
 http://www.ogier.com/AboutUs/Action/Sport/Pages/GuernseyRugbyAcademy.aspx
 http://www.thisisguernsey.com/2009/02/26/rugby-official-swore-but-was-not-disorderly/
 BBC's Guernsey Sports page
 Sylvans RFC

References

Sport in Guernsey
Sark